Oncidium ensatum, the Latin American orchid or Florida dancinglady orchid, is a species of orchid found in southern Florida, southern Mexico (Chiapas and the Yucatán Peninsula), Central America, Cuba, the Bahamas, and northwestern Venezuela.

The flowers are yellow with brown spots.

References

Institute for Regional Conservation, Floristic Inventory of South Florida Database Online, Oncidium ensatum Lindl., Florida dancinglady orchid
IOSPE orchid photos Oncidium ensatum
Gardening Europe

ensatum
Orchids of the Caribbean
Orchids of Central America
Orchids of Belize
Orchids of Cuba
Orchids of Mexico
Orchids of Florida
Orchids of Venezuela
Flora of the Bahamas
Plants described in 1842
Flora without expected TNC conservation status